The Cogburn Dipping Vat is a historic former cattle dipping facility in Ouachita National Forest, west of Black Spring, Arkansas. It is a U-shaped concrete structure, with a distinctive curved shape that matches the contours of the terrain, with a concrete pad at one end. It was built between 1930 and 1940 as part of a state program to eradicate Texas tick fever from the state's cattle. The vat's name derives from the Cogburn, who homesteaded a farm in the area, and probably built the vat to serve their needs and those of other nearby farmers.

The vat was listed on the National Register of Historic Places in 2006.

See also
 Guinn Dipping Vat
 National Register of Historic Places listings in Montgomery County, Arkansas

References

Agricultural buildings and structures on the National Register of Historic Places in Arkansas
Buildings and structures completed in 1920
National Register of Historic Places in Montgomery County, Arkansas
1920 establishments in Arkansas
Plunge dips
Ouachita National Forest